Aldo Tonin Bumçi (born 11 June 1974) is a member of the Assembly of the Republic of Albania for the Democratic Party of Albania. He was Minister of Justice from 2005 to 2007, Minister of Foreign Affairs on 2013.  He is also member of Committee on Legal Affairs, Public Administration and Human Rights and Committee on European Integration.

Early life
Bumçi was born 1974 in the Albanian capital of Tirana.

Career
He is a member of the Albanian Parliament, serving a constituency based around the northern Albanian town of Lezhë. He was elected as a representative of the Democratic Party of Albania.

Minister of Justice
From 2005 to 2007, he served as the country's Minister of Justice in the government of Prime Minister Sali Berisha.

Bumçi's term as Minister of Justice was marked by the government's efforts to dismiss the Prosecutor General of Albania, Theodhori Sollaku. While generally recognized to have been an ineffective Prosecutor General and accused by the ruling coalition of links to organized crime, the proceedings against him in the Parliament were deeply flawed , eventually leading President Alfred Moisiu to issue a statement saying more time is needed to examine all the related documentation. This led to an outcry from the Democratic Party, which claimed to have investigated 83 cases of criminal action by Sollaku and reached guilty verdicts in all of them  in an extraordinarily short period of time. After President Moisiu refused to decree the dismissal, Bumçi became the leading voice of the Democratic Party carrying on the fight to remove Sollaku.

Minister of Foreign Affairs
On 4 April 2013, Bumçi was appointed Minister of Foreign Affairs.

See also

List of foreign ministers in 2013
List of Ministers of Foreign Affairs of Albania

References

External links

|-

1974 births
Living people
Politicians from Tirana
Government ministers of Albania
Justice ministers of Albania
Foreign ministers of Albania
Tourism ministers of Albania
Democratic Party of Albania politicians
21st-century Albanian politicians